Arthur Kouassi (born 17 November 1989 in Bondoukou, Ivory Coast) is an Ivorian professional footballer who last played for Delhi FC.

Career

Club
In 2012, Kouassi signed for Shenzhen, before moving to Citizen AA for the 2013 season. After leaving Hong-Kong, Kouassi spent three season in the Philippines with Manila Jeepney and Global FC. During Kouassi's time with Global FC, they reached the 2016 UFL Cup final, where they lost 3–1 to Ceres. After leaving Global FC, Kouassi scored six goals in thirteen games for Chin United in the Myanmar National League during the first half of 2017. In the second half of 2017, Kouassi joined Ilocos United, scoring eleven goals in twenty games before leaving in early 2018. On 4 April 2018, Ulaanbaatar City FC announced the signing of Kouassi.

International
Kouassi has represented Ivory Coast at youth level on five occasions.

References

External links 

 Tiebreaker Times tag
 at Footballdatabase.eu

Ivorian expatriate footballers
People from Bondoukou
1989 births
Expatriate footballers in the Philippines
Expatriate footballers in China
Expatriate footballers in Hong Kong
Myanmar National League players
Expatriate footballers in Mongolia
Ivorian footballers
Living people
Association football forwards
Ceres–Negros F.C. players
Expatriate footballers in Myanmar
Global Makati F.C. players
Ulaanbaatar City FC players
Calcutta Football League players